In physics, and specifically in quantum field theory, a bispinor is a mathematical construction that is used to describe some of the fundamental particles of nature, including quarks and electrons. It is a specific embodiment of a spinor, specifically constructed so that it is consistent with the requirements of special relativity. Bispinors transform in a certain "spinorial" fashion under the action of the Lorentz group, which describes the symmetries of Minkowski spacetime. They occur in the relativistic spin- wave function solutions to the Dirac equation. 

Bispinors are so called because they are constructed out of two simpler component spinors, the Weyl spinors. Each of the two component spinors transform differently under the two distinct complex-conjugate spin-1/2 representations of the Lorentz group. This pairing is of fundamental importance, as it allows the represented particle to have a mass, carry a charge, and represent the flow of charge as a current, and perhaps most importantly, to carry angular momentum. More precisely, the mass is a Casimir invariant of the Lorentz group (an eigenstate of the energy), while the vector combination carries momentum and current, being covariant under the action of the Lorentz group. The angular momentum is carried by the Poynting vector, suitably constructed for the spin field.

A bispinor is more or less "the same thing" as a Dirac spinor. The convention used here is that the article on the Dirac spinor presents plane-wave solutions to the Dirac equation using the Dirac convention for the gamma matrices. That is, the Dirac spinor is a bispinor in the Dirac convention. By contrast, the article below concentrates primarily on the Weyl, or chiral representation, is less focused on the Dirac equation, and more focused on the geometric structure, including the geometry of the Lorentz group. Thus, much of what is said below can be applied to the Majorana equation.

Definition 
Bispinors are elements of a 4-dimensional complex vector space  representation of the Lorentz group.  

In the Weyl basis, a bispinor

Under parity transformation the Weyl spinors transform into each other.

The Dirac bispinor is connected with the Weyl bispinor by a unitary transformation to the  Dirac basis,

The Dirac basis is the one most widely used in the literature.

Expressions for Lorentz transformations of bispinors

A bispinor field  transforms according to the rule

where  is a Lorentz transformation.

In the Weyl basis, explicit transformation matrices for a boost  and for a rotation  are the following:

Here  is the boost parameter, and  represents rotation around the  axis.  are the Pauli matrices. The exponential is the exponential map, in this case the matrix exponential defined by putting the matrix into the usual power series for the exponential function.

Properties

A bilinear form of bispinors can be reduced to five irreducible (under the Lorentz group) objects:
 scalar, ;
 pseudo-scalar, ;
 vector, ;
 pseudo-vector, ;
 antisymmetric tensor,
These five quantities are inter-related by the Fierz identities. Their values are used in the Lounesto spinor field classification of the different types of spinors, of which the bispinor is just one; the others being the flagpole (of which the Majorana spinor is a special case), the flag-dipole, and the Weyl spinor. The flagpole, flag-dipole and Weyl spinors all have null mass and pseudoscalar fields; the flagpole additionally has a null pseudovector field, whereas the Weyl spinors have a null antisymmetric tensor (a null "angular momentum field").

A suitable Lagrangian for the relativistic spin- field can be built out of these, and is given as

The Dirac equation can be derived from this Lagrangian by using the Euler–Lagrange equation.

Derivation of a bispinor representation

Introduction 
This outline describes one type of bispinors as elements of a particular representation space of the (0) ⊕ (0) representation of the Lorentz group. This representation space is related to, but not identical to, the  representation space contained in the Clifford algebra over Minkowski spacetime as described in the article Spinors. Language and terminology is used as in Representation theory of the Lorentz group.

A representation of the Lie algebra  of the Lorentz group  will emerge among matrices that will be chosen as a basis (as a vector space) of the complex Clifford algebra over spacetime.

with the spacetime metric .

The gamma matrices 
Let  denote a set of four 4-dimensional gamma matrices, here called the Dirac matrices. The Dirac matrices satisfy

This is the defining condition for a generating set of a Clifford algebra. Further basis elements  of the Clifford algebra are given by

Only six of the matrices  are linearly independent. This follows directly from their definition since . They act on the subspace  the  span in the passive sense, according to

In , the second equality follows from property  of the Clifford algebra.

Lie algebra embedding of so(3,1) in Cl4(C) 

In the following, 

Bispinors introduced 
Now introduce any 4-dimensional complex vector space U where the γμ act by matrix multiplication. Here  will do nicely. Let  be a Lorentz transformation and define the action of the Lorentz group on U to be

It will turn out to be a projective representation. The elements of U, when endowed with the transformation rule given by S, are called bispinors or simply spinors.

A choice of Dirac matrices 
It remains to choose a set of Dirac matrices  in order to obtain the spin representation . One such choice, appropriate for the ultrarelativistic limit, is

In this representation of the Clifford algebra generators, the  become

This representation is manifestly not irreducible, since the matrices are all block diagonal. But by irreducibility of the Pauli matrices, the representation cannot be further reduced. Since it is a 4-dimensional, the only possibility is that it is a  representation, i.e. a bispinor representation.

a projective 2-valued representation is obtained. With the conventions used here one may write

for a bispinor field. Here, the upper component corresponds to a right Weyl spinor. To include space parity inversion in this formalism, one sets 

It is seen that the representation is irreducible when space parity inversion is included.

An example 
Then  but . Here,  denotes the identity element. If  is chosen instead, then still , but now .

This illustrates the double-valued nature of a spin representation. The identity in  gets mapped into either  or  depending on the choice of Lie algebra element to represent it. In the first case, one can speculate that a rotation of an angle  negates a bispinor, and that it requires a  rotation to rotate a bispinor back into itself.

It is impossible to continuously choose  for all  so that  is a continuous representation. Suppose that one defines  along a loop in  such that .

The Dirac algebra 
This representation, and how it decomposes as a direct sum of irreducible  representations, is described in the article on Dirac algebra. This decomposition hints how to couple any bispinor field with other fields in a Lagrangian to yield Lorentz scalars.

Bispinors and the Dirac algebra
The Dirac matrices are a set of four 4×4 matrices forming the Dirac algebra, and are used to intertwine the spin direction with the local reference frame (the local coordinate frame of spacetime), as well as to define charge (C-symmetry), parity and time reversal operators.

Conventions
There are several choices of signature and representation that are in common use in the physics literature. The Dirac matrices are typically written as  where  runs from 0 to 3. In this notation, 0 corresponds to time, and 1 through 3 correspond to x, y, and z.

At this time the  signature is in more common use, and our example will use this signature.

After choosing the signature, there are many ways of constructing a representation in the 4×4 matrices, and many are in common use. In order to make this example as general as possible we will not specify a representation until the final step. At that time we will substitute in the "chiral" or Weyl representation.

Construction of Dirac spinor with a given spin direction and charge
First we choose a spin direction for our electron or positron.  As with the example of the Pauli algebra discussed above, the spin direction is defined by a unit vector in 3 dimensions, (a, b, c).  Following the convention of Peskin & Schroeder, the spin operator for spin in the (a, b, c) direction is defined as the dot product of (a, b, c) with the vector

Note that the above is a root of unity, that is, it squares to 1.  Consequently, we can make a projection operator from it that projects out the sub-algebra of the Dirac algebra that has spin oriented in the (a, b, c) direction:

Now we must choose a charge, +1 (positron) or −1 (electron).

Note that  is also a square root of unity. They form a complete set of commuting operators for the Dirac algebra. Continuing with our example, we look for a representation of an electron with spin in the  direction. Turning  into a projection operator for charge = −1, we have

The projection operator for the spinor we seek is therefore the product of the two projection operators we've found:

The above projection operator, when applied to any spinor, will give that part of the spinor that corresponds to the electron state we seek. So we can apply it to a spinor with the value 1 in one of its components, and 0 in the others, which gives a column of the matrix.  Continuing the example, we put (a, b, c) = (0, 0, 1) and have

and so our desired projection operator is

The 4×4 gamma matrices used in the Weyl representation are

for k = 1, 2, 3  and where  are the usual 2×2 Pauli matrices.  Substituting these in for P gives

Our answer is any non-zero column of the above matrix.  The division by two is just a normalization.  The first and third columns give the same result:

More generally, for electrons and positrons with spin oriented in the (a, b, c) direction, the projection operator is

where the upper signs are for the electron and the lower signs are for the positron.  The corresponding spinor can be taken as any non zero column.  Since  the different columns are multiples of the same spinor. The representation of the resulting spinor in the Dirac basis can be obtained using the rule given in the bispinor article.

See also

Dirac spinor
Spin(3,1), the double cover of SO(3,1) by a spin group
Rarita–Schwinger equation

Notes

References 
 
.

Quantum field theory
Spinors